Tangle Ridge is a  mountain summit located in Jasper National Park, in the Canadian Rockies of Alberta, Canada. Tangle Ridge is situated south of Beauty Creek and north of Tangle Creek, in the Sunwapta River valley. Views from the top of Tangle Ridge provide photographers with an opportunity to capture the peaks surrounding the Columbia Icefield, some of which, such as Mount Columbia and Mount Alberta, are otherwise hidden from view along the Icefields Parkway.


History

The mountain was named by Mary Schäffer in 1907 for the difficulty that climbers had descending down Tangle Creek from the ridge. The mountain's name was officially adopted in 1935 by the Geographical Names Board of Canada.

Climate

Based on the Köppen climate classification, Tangle Ridge is located in a subarctic climate zone with cold, snowy winters, and mild summers. Temperatures can drop below −20 °C (−4 °F) with wind chill factors below −30 °C (−22 °F). Weather conditions during winter make Tangle Ridge one of the better places in the Rockies for ice climbing. Precipitation runoff from Tangle Ridge drains into the Sunwapta River which is a tributary of the Athabasca River.

Geology

Tangle Ridge is composed of sedimentary rock laid down from the Precambrian to Jurassic periods. Formed in shallow seas, this sedimentary rock was pushed east and over the top of younger rock during the Laramide orogeny.

Ice Climbing Routes

Ice Climbing Routes with grades on Tangle Ridge:

 Shades of Beauty – WI4
 Tangle Falls – WI2-3
 The Stage – WI3-4
 The Wings – WI3-4
 Curtain Call – WI6
 Cyber Pasty Memorial – WI5+
 Melt Out – WI3
 Rick Blak Memorial Route – WI5

Tangle Falls

Tangle Falls is a multi-tiered cascade that might be the most often photographed waterfall alongside the Icefields Parkway because of its easy access.
Height: 30 meters (100 ft)
Width: 12 meters (40 ft)
Coordinates: N 52° 16.035 W 117° 17.197

See also
List of mountains of Canada
Geography of Alberta

Gallery

References

External links
 Weather forecast: Tangle Ridge
 Parks Canada web site: Jasper National Park

Three-thousanders of Alberta
Mountains of Jasper National Park
Alberta's Rockies
Canadian Rockies